Whiteborough railway station was station serving the village of Huthwaite, Nottinghamshire on the Midland Railway's line from  in to  line. The line opened in 1883, following the opening of Pleasley Colliery in 1878. It closed to passengers in 1930.

References

 Huthwaite Online - Whiteborough Railway Station
 http://www.nottsheritagegateway.org.uk/themes/railways/nottsrailways1946.pdf

Bibliography

Disused railway stations in Nottinghamshire
Former Midland Railway stations
Railway stations in Great Britain opened in 1883
Railway stations in Great Britain closed in 1930
1883 establishments in England
1930 disestablishments in England